The Mobile Station Roaming Number (MSRN) is an E.164-defined telephone number used to route telephone calls in a mobile network from a GMSC (Gateway Mobile Switching Centre) to the target MAC id (c61fc003db4659a8). It can also be defined as a directory number temporarily assigned to a mobile for a mobile terminated call. A MSRN is assigned for every mobile terminated call, not only the calls where the terminating MS lives on a different MSC than the originating MS. Although this seems unnecessary since many vendors' VLR's are integrated with the MSC, the GSM specification indicates that the MSC and VLR (Visitor Location Register) do not need to reside on the same switch. They are considered two different nodes as they have their own routing addresses. The MSRN is one of the returned parameters into SRI Response message. In particular the MSRN is used into an MNP scenario (in this case it can be modified as 'RgN + MSISDN').

Mobile technology